Peter Riggs (born August 17, 1979) is an American politician and businessman serving as a member of the Idaho Senate from the 3rd district. Elected in November 2020, he assumed office on December 1, 2020.

Early life and education 
Riggs was born and raised in Kootenai County, Idaho, the son of politician and physician Jack Riggs. After graduating from Lake City High School, he earned a Bachelor of Fine Arts in musical theatre and Master of Business Administration from the University of Idaho.

Career 
In 2001, Riggs appeared in the horror film Shredder. In 2005, he executive produced and starred in Roulette.

In 2003, Riggs became a Pita Pit franchisee. He eventually rose in the corporate ranks of the company, becoming vice president of brand promotion, president, and president and CEO of the organization's U.S.-based operations. Riggs left the company in December 2018 and became the chief strategy officer of KORE Power, a renewable energy company.

In the 2020 election for the 3rd district of the Idaho Senate, Riggs placed first in a field of three candidates in the Republican primary. He did not face a Democratic opponent in the November general election. Riggs was sworn in on December 1, 2020.

Personal life 
Riggs and his wife, Tyree, have two sons.

Filmography

References 

1979 births
21st-century American politicians
Businesspeople from Idaho
Republican Party Idaho state senators
Living people
Male actors from Idaho
People from Kootenai County, Idaho
University of Idaho alumni